Tara Hills is a census-designated place (CDP) in Contra Costa County, California, United States. The population was 5,126 at the 2010 census.

Geography

Tara Hills is located in the San Francisco Bay Area region of Northern California.

Although this is a census area, outside of the City of San Pablo, the mailing addresses are San Pablo, California.

Demographics

2010
The 2010 United States Census reported that Tara Hills had a population of 5,126. The racial makeup of Tara Hills was 2,212 (43.2%) White, 682 (13.3%) African American, 31 (0.6%) Native American, 869 (17.0%) Asian, 18 (0.4%) Pacific Islander, 1,018 (19.9%) from other races, and 296 (5.8%) from two or more races. Hispanic or Latino of any race were 1,947 persons (38.0%).

The Census reported that 99.7% of the population lived in households and 0.3% lived in non-institutionalized group quarters.

There were 1,662 households, out of which 674 (40.6%) had children under the age of 18 living in them, 874 (52.6%) were opposite-sex married couples living together, 251 (15.1%) had a female householder with no husband present, 127 (7.6%) had a male householder with no wife present.  There were 82 (4.9%) unmarried opposite-sex partnerships, and 13 (0.8%) same-sex married couples or partnerships. 326 households (19.6%) were made up of individuals, and 147 (8.8%) had someone living alone who was 65 years of age or older. The average household size was 3.08.  There were 1,252 families (75.3% of all households); the average family size was 3.55.

The population was spread out, with 1,227 people (23.9%) under the age of 18, 540 people (10.5%) aged 18 to 24, 1,359 people (26.5%) aged 25 to 44, 1,344 people (26.2%) aged 45 to 64, and 656 people (12.8%) who were 65 years of age or older.  The median age was 36.8 years. For every 100 females, there were 95.2 males.  For every 100 females age 18 and over, there were 92.5 males.

The homeowner vacancy rate was 2.0%; the rental vacancy rate was 3.3%.  3,618 people (70.6% of the population) lived in owner-occupied housing units and 1,494 people (29.1%) lived in rental housing units.

2000
As of the census of 2000, there were 5,332 people, 1,792 households, and 1,370 families residing in the CDP. The racial makeup of the CDP was 51.76% White, 14.44% Black or African American, 0.66% Native American, 14.14% Asian, 0.54% Pacific Islander, 12.55% from other races, and 5.91% from two or more races.  23.87% of the population were Hispanic or Latino of any race.

There were 1,792 households, out of which 35.5% had children under the age of 18 living with them, 57.4% were married couples living together, 12.7% had a female householder with no husband present, and 23.5% were non-families. 17.9% of all households were made up of individuals, and 5.0% had someone living alone who was 65 years of age or older.  The average household size was 2.96 and the average family size was 3.34.

In the CDP, the population was spread out, with 26.1% under the age of 18, 8.6% from 18 to 24, 31.2% from 25 to 44, 23.2% from 45 to 64, and 11.0% who were 65 years of age or older.  The median age was 36 years. For every 100 females, there were 98.5 males.  For every 100 females age 18 and over, there were 94.5 males.

The median income for a household in the CDP was $56,380, and the median income for a family was $60,774. Males had a median income of $41,090 versus $32,500 for females. The per capita income for the CDP was $22,946.  About 2.7% of families and 5.2% of the population were below the poverty line, including 3.6% of those under age 18 and 7.8% of those age 65 or over.

Commerce 
The neighborhood is near 2 two shopping centers.

The eastern and upper border has Pinole Square (previously known as Appian 80) at the intersection of Appian Way and I-80. It includes a Safeway grocery store and CVS drug store. And the stores on Fitzgerald drive

At the west end near San Pablo Bay, the Spectrum Center Tara Hills Campus occupies most of the Tara Hills old Shopping Center.

San Pablo Avenue borders the northwest side of the neighborhood and is home to many businesses.

Education
Tara Hills is in the West Contra Costa Unified School District.

References

Census-designated places in Contra Costa County, California
Census-designated places in California